The 2010 Auto One V8 Ute Racing Series was a motor racing series for Ford Falcon and Holden utilities (commonly known as "utes"), built and conforming to V8 Utes series regulations and those holding valid licences to compete as issued by series organisers Spherix and Australian V8 Ute Racing Pty. Ltd. The series formed the tenth running of a national series for V8 Utes in Australia. The series began on 17 March 2010 at the Adelaide Street Circuit and ended on 2 December at the Homebush Street Circuit after 8 rounds.

The series was won by Grant Johnson, driving a Holden VE SS Ute.

Teams and drivers
The following drivers competed in the 2010 V8 Utes series

Race calendar
The 2010 V8 Utes Series consisted of eight rounds, all of which were held on the support programme of the V8 Supercar Championship Series.

Series Points

References

External links
 Official series website
 2010 Racing Results Archive

V8 Utes
V8 Ute Racing Series